Concord Group is a Bangladeshi conglomerate. The industries under this conglomerate include construction, real estate, architecture & design, communication, entertainment, hospitality, and garments. SM Kamaluddin is the chairman.

History 
Concord Group was founded in 1975. Concord Group completed Fantasy Kingdom, a multimillion-dollar amusement park, in 2002 in Savar. In 2004, the Government of Bangladesh leased the historic Foy's Lake to Concord Group for 50 years to develop into a resort and amusement park named Foy's Lake Concord.  In 2007, Concord Group started the construction of Police Plaza. The shopping complex, Police Plaza was built in partnership with Bangladesh Police Welfare Trust of Bangladesh Police. The Plaza is located in Gulshan and was completed in 2015.

Concord Group has set up the first satellite township in Bangladesh. Also they constructed Bangladesh's first revolving tower in Chattogram.  Concord setup 7 world class theme parks in Bangladesh such as Fantasy Kingdom & Foy's Lake Complex. They introduced Reinforced Concrete Block Masonry technology which is a better structural system for earthquakeprone zones.

Controversy 
The Department of Environment fined Concord Group 1.4 million taka for building a 12-storey and two 15-storey buildings without the departments permission.

On 17 September 2015, the Bangladesh High Court required Concord to hand over an 18-story building built on  land of Sir Salimullah Muslim Orphanage. It was determined that the contract used to acquire the land was illegal.

Awards 
BID international Quality Summit (IQS) Award 2010 in New York based on "Excellence, Innovation, Customer Satisfaction, Technology, Leadership Strategic Planning & Business Results". They are recipient of the Daily Star - DHL Bangladesh Business Award in the category: "Enterprise of the year 2000' in recognition of "Outstanding Leadership Quality and as Role model in Corporate Business in Bangladesh. National Environment Medal-2022 for contribution to environment protection and pollution control.

List of companies and establishment dates
 Late 1972: Concord Construction Co
 1976-02-10 : Concord Engineers & Construction LTD
 1983-03-05 : Jeacon Garments LTD
 1988-07-31 : MNK Marbel & Tiles Technology LTD
 1989-01-26 : Bangladesh Gypsum Products (pte) LTD
 1989-01-28 : Modern Furniture & Interior Décor (pte) LTD
 1989-02-12 : MNK Chemicals and Home Services LTD
 1989-04-03 : Concord Condominium LTD
 1990-07-29 : Concord Ready-Mix & Concrete Products LTD
 1991-06-20 : Concord Fashion Export LTD
 1994-28-04 : Concord Architects & Interior Décor LTD
 1997-04-05 : Concord Real Estate & Building Products LTD
 1999-05-09 : Concord Real Estate & Development LTD
 2000-01-06 : Concord Pre-stressed Concrete & Block Plant LTD
 2001-02-01 : Concord Entertainment Co. Ltd
 2003-06-29 : Concord Architects & Engineers LTD
 2003-08-03 : Concord Communication Co LTD
 2008-01-03 : Concord Consortium LTD
 2008-06-19 : Concord City Development LTD

See also
 List of companies of Bangladesh

References

Further reading
 

Real estate companies of Bangladesh
Conglomerate companies of Bangladesh
Companies based in Dhaka
Bangladeshi companies established in 1975
Real estate companies established in 1975